This is a list of notable Estonian sportspeople. The criteria for inclusion in this list are:
1–3 places winners at major international tournaments;
for team sports, winning in preliminary competitions of finals at major international tournaments, or playing for several seasons for clubs of major national leagues; or
holders of past and current world records.

Athletics
Rein Aun
Ksenija Balta
Bruno Junk
Gerd Kanter
Aleksander Klumberg
Johannes Kotkas
Pavel Loskutov
Jüri Lossmann
Rasmus Mägi
Erki Nool
Mikk Pahapill
Uno Palu
Jane Salumäe
Jüri Tamm
Aleksander Tammert
Jüri Tarmak
Jaak Uudmäe
Andrus Värnik

Basketball
Heino Enden
Kristjan Kangur
Anatoli Krikun
Heino Kruus
Ilmar Kullam
Gert Kullamäe
Mart Laga
Tõnno Lepmets
Jaak Lipso
Joann Lõssov
Martin Müürsepp
Jaak Salumets
Tiit Sokk
Aleksei Tammiste
Priit Tomson
Siim-Sander Vene

Biathlon
Kaija Parve
Indrek Tobreluts

Boxing
Nikolai Stepulov

Canoeing
Mikhail Kaaleste
Heino Kurvet

Cross-country skiing

Jaak Mae
Kristina Šmigun-Vähi
Andrus Veerpalu

Cycling
Tõnis Erm
Tanel Kangert
Jaan Kirsipuu
Aavo Pikkuus
Erika Salumäe
Rein Taaramäe

Disc Golf
Kristin Tattar

Fencing

Julia Beljajeva
Irina Embrich
Sven Järve
Kaido Kaaberma
Erika Kirpu
Kristina Kuusk
Meelis Loit
Nikolai Novosjolov
Heidi Rohi
Maarika Võsu
Oksana Yermakova
Viktor Zuikov

Football
Ragnar Klavan
Marek Lemsalu
Marko Meerits
Henrik Ojamaa
Andres Oper
Raio Piiroja
Mart Poom
Andrei Stepanov
Konstantin Vassiljev
Indrek Zelinski

Freestyle skiing
Kelly Sildaru

Judo
Aleksei Budõlin
Martin Padar
Indrek Pertelson

Modern pentathlon
Hanno Selg

Nordic combined
Allar Levandi

Rallying
 Markko Märtin 
 Ott Tänak

Rowing

Raul Arnemann
Tõnu Endrekson
Leonid Gulov
Jüri Jaanson
Andrei Jämsä
Mart Kuusik
Igor Kuzmin
Vladimir Latin
Kaisa Pajusalu
Allar Raja
Kaspar Taimsoo

Sailing
Aleksandr Chuchelov
Andreas Faehlmann
Georg Faehlmann
Tõnu Tõniste
Toomas Tõniste
Nikolai Vekšin
Eberhard Vogdt
William von Wirén

Speed skating
Ants Antson

Swimming
Martti Aljand
Triin Aljand
Kaire Indrikson
Indrek Sei
Ivar Stukolkin
Eve Uusmees
Ulvi Voog

Tennis

Kaia Kanepi
Anett Kontaveit
Toomas Leius

Volleyball
Viljar Loor

Weightlifting
Gustav Ernesaks
Jaan Kikkas
Arnold Luhaäär
Alfred Neuland
Alfred Schmidt
Jaan Talts
Harald Tammer

Wrestling

Georg Baumann
August Englas
Osvald Käpp
Martin Klein
Albert Kusnets
Epp Mäe
Heiki Nabi
August Neo
Kristjan Palusalu
Eduard Pütsep
Roman Steinberg
Voldemar Väli

See also
Estonian Athlete of the Year
Estonia at the Olympics
Sport in Estonia

 
Estonian sportspeople